According to the Turkic belief, kut (also spelled qut,  or 'fortune'), is a kind of force vitalizing the body. Through kut, humans are connected with the heavens. Further, the sacred ruler is believed to be endowed with much more kut than other people, thus the heaven would had appointing him as the legitimate ruler. Turkic Khagans claimed that they were "heaven-like, heaven-conceived" and possessed kut, a sign of the heavenly mandate to rule. Rulers of the Qocho were entitled "idiqut", meaning "sacred good fortune". It also existed in Mongols as suu. It was believed that if the ruler had lost his kut, he could be dethroned and killed. However, this had to be carried out without shedding his blood. This was usually done by strangling with a silk cord. This custom of strangling continued among the Ottomans.

Usage by Ottomans
Ottomans continued this tradition by reexpressing the "ruler's heavenly mandate" (kut) into Irano-Islamic terms with titles such as "shadow of God on earth" (zill Allah fi'l-alem) and "caliph of the face of the earth" (halife-i ru-yi zemin).

Name

Kutlug is frequently used and well-known personal Uyghur name. It was also the name of first rulers of the Second Turkic Khaganate, Ilterish Qaghan, and the Uyghur Khaganate, Kutlug I Bilge Kagan.

See also
 Kutadgu Bilig
 Mandate of Heaven

Reference

Tengriism
 Vitalism